The Hawthorn Fire Station is a historic fire station at 66-68 William Street in Hawthorn in Victoria, Australia.  It has also been known as the Hawthorn Metropolitan Fire Station and as the Former Hawthorn Fire Station.

It was recognized by the Victoria Heritage Council by listing into the Victorian Heritage Register. It was described in 1999 as "architecturally and historically important to the State of Victoria."  The VHC further statedThe Hawthorn Fire Station was constructed in 1910 to the design of Cedric Ballantyne of the architectural firm of Oakden and Ballantyne. The two storey asymmetrically planned, red brick building consists of a fire station at ground floor level and two flats above. The building is designed in the Edwardian Freestyle and its most notable features are its arched vehicle openings with original timber doors, and its Art Nouveau wrought iron detailing. Apart from minor and reversible modifications the building is remarkably intact and retains all the features of a small suburban fire station.

andThe Hawthorn Fire Station is architecturally important as a particularly successful adaptation of the Edwardian Freestyle to a domestically scaled suburban fire station. It is also important as a design of then noted architect Cedric Ballantyne of the firm Oakden and Ballantyne who designed most of the Metropolitan Fire Brigade's buildings in the early twentieth century.

andThe Hawthorn Fire Station is historically important as an outstanding and virtually intact example of a small suburban fire station. The building is important for its ability to demonstrate the way of life, accommodation and methods of work in an early twentieth century fire station. The high degree of intactness and retention of original fabric in the face of pressures for modernisation increase the buildings significance."

It also was recognized in 1992 by the City of Boroondara as "Architecturally, an original and successful example of Edwardian Freestyle architecture applied by prominent architects, Oakden and Ballantyne, to.a utility-use building which is unmatched in other contemporary fire stations, and possesses valuable Art Nouveau inspired iron detailing: of high regional importance. / Historically, of local interest as a public utility building."

It has also been recognized by the National Trust in 1985 or 2005 as "A successful and largely intact Edwardian Freestyle fire station of 1910 by the prominent architects Oakden & Ballantyne, distinguished by its deeply set arched vehicle entrances complete with folding doors, its valuable Art Nouveau wrought iron details and, as counterpoint to the bold asymmetry of the station, the bland proto-Modern residential section adjoining."

References

Fire stations in Victoria (Australia)
Heritage-listed buildings in Melbourne
Buildings and structures in the City of Boroondara
Fire stations completed in 1910
1910 establishments in Australia
Edwardian architecture in Australia